Fungus Amongus is the debut studio album by American rock band Incubus, released November 1, 1995, on Stopuglynailfungus Music on Chillum, Incubus' own independent label. It was later re-released under Epic/Immortal on November 7, 2000, after popular demand.

Album information

Many of the names given under 'Personnel' are actually pseudonyms for the band members. 'Fabio' is guitarist Mike Einziger; 'Dirk Lance' is bassist Alex Katunich, who later adopted 'Dirk Lance' as his stage name; 'Brandy Flower' is an actual Sony employee; and 'Happy Knappy' is vocalist Brandon Boyd. 'Brett' and 'Brett Spivery' refer to Brett Spivey, longtime friend of the band, who went on to make their first two DVDs, and the videos for "I Miss You" and "Summer Romance (Anti-Gravity Love Song)".

The album cover image is of a fly agaric mushroom.

Stylistically, the album shows strong influences by funk metal bands such as Red Hot Chili Peppers, Primus, and Mr. Bungle, all of whom are mentioned in the liner notes of the album. Also, the group presents a quasi-rap style, which continued onto S.C.I.E.N.C.E., showing Brandon rapping on songs such as "Psychopsilocybin", "Trouble in 421", "Speak Free", and "Take Me to Your Leader".

Reception
Upon initial release, the album failed to chart; however, when re-released in 2000 by Epic/Immortal records, it managed to peak at number 116 on the Billboard 200. The album received generally negative reviews from critics. Dean Carlson of AllMusic wrote, "Incubus' independent debut is an unremarkable take on suburban MTV funk."  He also criticized frontman Brandon Boyd, writing, "there's much to dislike, notably frontman Brandon Boyd, who growls like he wants the voice of anybody but himself". Tim Grierson of About.com observed, "At this early stage, Incubus just sounded like a tired rehash of Rage Against the Machine and Red Hot Chili Peppers."

When looking back on Incubus's discography in a 2017 interview with Kerrang!, Boyd observed, "[Fungus Amongus] was super-fun to make, but we didn't know what we were doing. I guess that's why a lot of our fans love that record, but for me when I hear it I truly cringe. I would just as soon bury it forever."

In 2020, Ultimate Guitar included it on their list of the "Top 8 Iconic Funk Metal Albums".

Chart

Track listing

Personnel
 Brandon Boyd (credited as "Happy Knappy") – vocals, djembe
 Mike Einziger ("Fabio") – guitars
 Alex Katunich ("Dirk Lance") – bass guitar
 José Pasillas ("Salsa") – drums

References

1995 debut albums
Epic Records albums
Funk metal albums
Incubus (band) albums